During the 1991–92 English football season, Blackburn Rovers F.C. competed in the Football League Second Division.

Season summary
In the 1991–92 season, Blackburn Rovers began with Don Mackay still manager, but he was soon sacked to make way for Kenny Dalglish. Dalglish made several substantial signings during the season. After his appointment Blackburn climbed up the league table, but later lost six games in a row, causing them to fall out of the play-off places, but Blackburn fought back and a 3–1 victory at Plymouth got Rovers to the final play off place. The club reached the play-off final at Wembley where they beat Leicester City 1–0 thanks to a Mike Newell penalty.

Final league table

Results
Blackburn Rovers' score comes first

Football League Second Division

Second Division play-offs

FA Cup

League Cup

Full Members Cup

Squad

References

Blackburn Rovers F.C. seasons
Blackburn Rovers